Maghen Abraham may refer to:

 Congregation Maghen Abraham (Montreal)
 Maghen Abraham Synagogue, in Beirut, Lebanon

See also
 Magen Abraham (disambiguation)